Aavani Kanavukal (1997) is a Malayalam studio album by Bombay Ravi. The lyrics for this album was penned by Yusuf Ali Kecheri.

Track list

References

External links
 

1997 albums